In the 2015 Season Coventry Bears competed in the RFL League 1 and was the first time in the club's history that they competed in the professional leagues of rugby league. Although they won just 5 league matches in their debut season, it was in many ways a successful start to life in the professional leagues with the club attracting an average attendance of 458 and being awarded the League 1 Project of the Year.

Results

References

External links 
Official website

Rugby league teams in the West Midlands (county)
Sport in Coventry
2015 in English rugby league
2015 in rugby league by club